Gez (also: Gezköy) is a village in the Bayburt District, Bayburt Province, Turkey. Its population is 169 (2021).

References

Villages in Bayburt District